Cbp/p300-interacting transactivator 2 is a protein that in humans is encoded by the CITED2 gene.

Interactions 

CITED2 has been shown to interact with EP300, LHX2, TFAP2A, and WT1.

References

Further reading

External links